Walter Bailey may refer to:
 Walter Bailey (lawyer), state prosecutor in South Carolina
 Walter T. Bailey (1882–1941), American architect from Kewanee, Illinois
 Walter Bailey (footballer) (1876–?), English footballer

See also
 Walter Bayley (1529–1593), English physician
 Harold Walter Bailey (1899–1996), English scholar of languages